Yellow Magic Orchestra is the first official studio album by Japanese electronic music band Yellow Magic Orchestra, who were previously known as the Yellow Magic Band. Originally released by Alfa Records, in Japan in 1978, the album was released by A&M Records in Europe and the United States and Canada in early 1979, with the US version featuring new cover art but without the closing track of "Acrobat". Both versions would later be re-issued in 2003 as a double-disc format, with the American version as the first disc.

The album was an early example of synth-pop, a genre that the band helped pioneer. It contributed to the development of electro, hip hop, techno, and bleep techno. The album's innovations in electronic music included its use of the microprocessor-based Roland MC-8 Microcomposer music sequencer which allowed the creation of new electronic sounds, and its sampling of video game sounds.

The album sold 250,000 copies in Japan and entered the Billboard 200 and R&B Albums charts in the United States. Its most successful single was "Computer Game / Firecracker", which sold over 400,000 records in the United States and was a top 20 hit in the United Kingdom.

Production
The album was intended to be a one-off project for producer and bass player Haruomi Hosono and the two session musicians he had hired: drummer Yukihiro Takahashi and keyboard player Ryuichi Sakamoto. The trio were to create their own cover version of Martin Denny's 1959 exotica melody "Firecracker" with modern electronics, as a subversion of the exoticisation and Orientalism of the original tune, along with various original compositions also exploring themes of Asianness, exoticisation and Orientalism from a Japanese perspective. The album would eventually be called Yellow Magic Orchestra, as a satire of Japan's obsession with black magic at the time. The project proved highly popular, culminating in a career for the three musicians; one that would last until 1983, before successful solo careers and reunions over the decades to come.

They began recording the album in July 1978 at a Shibaura studio in Tokyo. It utilized a wide variety of electronic music equipment (as well as electric), including the Roland MC-8 Microcomposer, the Korg PS-3100 polyphonic synthesizer, the Korg VC-10 vocoder, the Yamaha Drums and Syn-Drums electronic drum kits, the Moog III-C and Minimoog monosynths, the Polymoog and ARP Odyssey analog synthesizers, the Oberheim Eight-Voice synthesizer, the Fender Rhodes electric piano, and the Fender Jazz Bass. Besides the electronic equipment, the only acoustic instruments used in the album were a Steinway piano, drum set, and a marimba.

It was the earliest known popular music album to use the Roland MC-8 Microcomposer, which was programmed by Hideki Matsutake during recording sessions. The swingy funk element present throughout the album was expressed by Matsutake programming through subtle variations of the MC-8's input. At the time, Billboard noted that the use of such computer-based technology in conjunction with synthesizers allowed Yellow Magic Orchestra to create new sounds that were not possible until then. The band later described both the MC-8 and Matsutake as an "inevitable factor" in both their music production and live performances.

The album was an early example of synth-pop, a genre that Yellow Magic Orchestra helped pioneer. Yellow Magic Orchestra experiments with different styles of electronic music, such as Asian melodies played over synthpop backings in "Firecracker" and "Cosmic Surfin'", the extensive use of video game sounds in "Computer Game", and the electronic disco bass in "Tong Poo", a song that was inspired by Chinese music produced during the China's Cultural Revolution, and in turn influenced video game music such as Tetris. Both "Computer Game" tracks proper contain the same audio and were made to sound as if both games were being played in the same room; each track being from the perspective of its titular arcade game unit: Circus and Space Invaders. The song also samples the opening chiptune used in the arcade game Gun Fight (1975). Both Circus and Space Invaders, along with several other popular arcade video games, were also featured in the promotional film for "Tong Poo".

Release history
The album was first released in Japan in 1978. It was released in the US on 30 May 1979 by A&M Records on the Horizon label with a new mix by Al Schmitt, new cover art and a slightly different track listing. This "US version" was subsequently released in Japan on 25 July 1979 by Alfa. Promotional A&M copies were pressed on yellow vinyl.

"Firecracker" was released as a single under the name "Computer Game". As such, on early US pressings of the album, "Computer Game 'Theme from The Circus" and "Firecracker" were combined as one track, while the firecracker sound effect at the end of the track was indexed by itself as "Firecracker". This was corrected on later pressings. US pressings also featured a more American-friendly mixing (highlighting a punchier equalization and heavy use of reverb). Several of the segues on the second side of the album were edited differently, while "Bridge over Troubled Music" was given an additional electric piano solo over top of the introductory percussion.

Reception

From contemporary reviews, Rosalind Russell of Record Mirror compared the group to Giorgio Moroder and Kraftwerk stating that  the group "might resign themselves to coming a poor second." finding that the groups ethnicity and accents "may put off this nation xenophobes. But who needs the UK? In the disco world we're small stakes anyway: the sons of Nihon are probably casting their eyes to the States and Germany."

Track listing

Original pressing

US pressing

PersonnelYellow Magic Orchestra – arrangements, electronicsHaruomi Hosono – bass guitar, synth bass, synthesizers, production, mixing engineer (credited as "Harry Hosono" for latter two)
Ryuichi Sakamoto – synthesizers, piano, electric piano, percussion, orchestration
Yukihiro Takahashi – vocals, drums, electronic drums, marimba, percussionGuest musiciansHideki Matsutake – Microcomposer programming
Chris Mosdell – lyrics
Shun'ichi "Tyrone" Hashimoto – vocoded vocals on "Simoon"
Masayoshi Takanaka – electric guitar on "Cosmic Surfin'" and "La femme chinoise"
Tomoko Nunoi (uncredited on earliest issues) – French narration (credited as "Sexy Voice") on "La femme chinoise"StaffKunihiko Murai – executive producer
Norio Yoshizawa & Atsushi Saito – recording engineers
Shunsuke Miyasumi – recording coordinator
Masako Hikasa & Akira Ikuta – management
Aijiro Wakita – design, art director
Kazuo Hakamada – illustrationsUS version alternative staff'''
Minako Yoshida – vocals on "Yellow Magic (Tong Poo)"
Tommy LiPuma – supervisor
Al Schmitt – mixing engineer
Mike Reese – mastering engineer
Roland Young – art director
Amy Nagasawa & Chuck Beeson – design
Lou Beach – front cover art
Masayoshi Sukita – back cover art

Charts

"Computer Game / Firecracker"
The song "Firecracker" was released as a single in Japan in 1978 and in the United States and United Kingdom in 1979, becoming a major R&B hit in the United States. The same year, the song was released as the "Computer Game" single, which combined the "Computer Game" and "Firecracker" tracks together. The "Computer Game" single was an even greater international success, selling over 400,000 copies in the United States and entering the top 20 of the UK Singles Chart.

Charts

In popular culture
The song was popular with the emerging hip hop community, which appreciated the new electronic sounds, and in the Bronx, where it was later sampled by pioneering hip hop artist Afrika Bambaataa in his famous 1983 debut album Death Mix (1983). The "terse video-game funk" sounds of "Computer Game" would have a strong influence on the emerging electro and hip hop music genres; the song's use of video game sounds and bleeps has been described as "ahead of their time" and as having a strong influence on 1980s hip hop and pop music. It was later included in electro hip hop artist Kurtis Mantronik's compilation album That's My Beat (2002), which consists of electro music that influenced his early career.

The song was also an influence on early techno, specifically Detroit techno, for which it was included in Carl Craig's compilation album Kings of Techno (2006). The song also influenced Sheffield's bleep techno music; Warp's third record, "Testone" (1990) by Sweet Exorcist, defined Sheffield's techno sound, by making playful use of sampled sounds from "Computer Game" along with dialogues from the film Close Encounters of the Third Kind (1977).

De La Soul's "Funky Towel" (for the 1996 film Joe's Apartment), Jennifer Lopez's hit "I'm Real" (2001), and the original version of Mariah Carey's "Loverboy" (for the 2001 film soundtrack Glitter), which was released as part of the 2020 compilation album The Rarities on October 2, 2020, also sampled the song.

The anime series Cowboy Bebop'' has a character named Mad Pierrot, and Mad Pierrot's other alias is "Tongpu".

References

Sources
 

Yellow Magic Orchestra albums
1978 debut albums
Alfa Records albums
A&M Records albums
Horizon Records albums
Electronic albums by Japanese artists
Synth-pop albums by Japanese artists